This is a complete list of Scottish Statutory Instruments in 2001.

1-100

 Cattle (Identification of Older Animals) (Scotland) Regulations 2001 (S.S.I. 2001/1)
 Advice and Assistance (Assistance by Way of Representation) (Scotland) Amendment Regulations 2001 (S.S.I. 2001/2)
 Specified Risk Material Amendment (Scotland) Regulations 2001 (S.S.I. 2001/3)
 Specified Risk Material Order Amendment (Scotland) Regulations 2001 (S.S.I. 2001/4)
 National Assistance (Assessment of Resources) Amendment (Scotland) Regulations 2001 (S.S.I. 2001/6)
 Budget (Scotland) Act 2000 (Amendment) Order 2001 (S.S.I. 2001/7)
 Act of Sederunt (Ordinary Cause Rules) Amendment (Commercial Actions) 2001 (S.S.I. 2001/8)
 Food Protection (Emergency Prohibitions) (Amnesic Shellfish Poisoning) (West Coast) (No. 6) (Scotland) Revocation Order 2001 (S.S.I. 2001/9)
 Food Protection (Emergency Prohibitions) (Amnesic Shellfish Poisoning) (West Coast) (No. 2) (Scotland) Partial Revocation Order 2001 (S.S.I. 2001/10)
 Food Protection (Emergency Prohibitions) (Amnesic Shellfish Poisoning) (West Coast) (Scotland) Revocation Order 2001 (S.S.I. 2001/11)
 A1 Trunk Road (Dolphingstone Southbound Off-Slip Road) (Temporary Prohibition of Traffic) Order 2001 (S.S.I. 2001/13)
 A1 Trunk Road (Haddington West Interchange to Haddington East Interchange) (Temporary Prohibition of Traffic) Order 2001 (S.S.I. 2001/14)
 A77 Trunk Road (Turnberry) (40 mph Speed Limit) Order 2001 (S.S.I. 2001/15)
 Smoke Control Areas (Exempt Fireplaces) (Scotland) Order 2001 (S.S.I. 2001/16)
 General Teaching Council (Scotland) Election Scheme 2001 Approval Order 2001 (S.S.I. 2001/18)
 Local Government Pension Scheme (Pension Sharing on Divorce) (Scotland) Regulations 2001 (S.S.I. 2001/23)
 Food Protection (Emergency Prohibitions) (Amnesic Shellfish Poisoning) (West Coast) (No. 2) (Scotland) Partial Revocation (No. 2) Order 2001 (S.S.I. 2001/24)
 Environmentally Sensitive Areas (Central Borders) Designation Amendment Order 2001 (S.S.I. 2001/25)
 Environmentally Sensitive Areas (Stewartry) Designation Amendment Order 2001 (S.S.I. 2001/26)
 Environmentally Sensitive Areas (Argyll Islands) Designation Amendment Order 2001 (S.S.I. 2001/27)
 Environmentally Sensitive Areas (Machair of the Uists and Benbecula, Barra and Vatersay) Designation Amendment Order 2001 (S.S.I. 2001/28)
 Environmentally Sensitive Areas (Shetland Islands) DesignationAmendment Order 2001 (S.S.I. 2001/29)
 Environmentally Sensitive Areas (Breadalbane) Designation Amendment Order 2001 (S.S.I. 2001/30)
 Environmentally Sensitive Areas (Western Southern Uplands) Designation Amendment Order 2001 (S.S.I. 2001/31)
 Environmentally Sensitive Areas (Central Southern Uplands) Designation Amendment Order 2001 (S.S.I. 2001/32)
 Environmentally Sensitive Areas (Cairngorms Straths) Designation Amendment Order 2001 (S.S.I. 2001/33)
 Environmentally Sensitive Areas (Loch Lomond) Designation Amendment Order 2001 (S.S.I. 2001/34)
 European Communities (Matrimonial Jurisdiction and Judgments) (Scotland) Regulations 2001 (S.S.I. 2001/36)
 Housing Revenue Account General Fund Contribution Limits (Scotland) Order 2001 (S.S.I. 2001/37)
 Coffee Extracts and Chicory Extracts (Scotland) Regulations 2001 (S.S.I. 2001/38)
 Designation of UHI Millennium Institute (Scotland) Order 2001 (S.S.I. 2001/39)
 Highland and Islands Agricultural Processing and Marketing Grants Etc. (Scotland) Regulations 2001 (S.S.I. 2001/40)
 Number of Inner House Judges (Variation) Order 2001 (S.S.I. 2001/41)
 Legal Aid (Scotland) Act 1986 Amendment Regulations 2001 (S.S.I. 2001/42)
 Advice and Assistance (Assistance by Way of Representation) (Scotland) Amendment (No. 2) Regulations 2001 (S.S.I. 2001/43)
 Non-Domestic Rate (Scotland) Order 2001 (S.S.I. 2001/44)
 Diseases of Animals (Approved Disinfectants) Amendment (Scotland) Order 2001 (S.S.I. 2001/45)
 A80 Trunk Road (Muirhead Traffic Lights) (30 mph Speed Limit) Order 2001 (S.S.I. 2001/46)
 A80 Trunk Road (Muirhead and Moodiesburn) (50 mph Speed Limit) Order 2001 (S.S.I. 2001/47)
 Foot-and-Mouth Disease Declaratory (Controlled Area) (Scotland) Order 2001 (S.S.I. 2001/49)
 Less Favoured Area Support Scheme (Scotland) Regulations 2001 (S.S.I. 2001/50)
 Diseases of Animals (Approved Disinfectants) Amendment (No. 2) (Scotland) Order 2001 (S.S.I. 2001/51)
 Foot-and-Mouth Disease (Amendment) (Scotland) Order 2001 (S.S.I. 2001/52)
 Food Protection (Emergency Prohibitions) (Paralytic Shellfish Poisoning) (Orkney) (Scotland) Revocation Order 2001 (S.S.I. 2001/53)
 Nurses, Midwives and Health Visitors (Professional Conduct) (Amendment) Rules 2001 Approval (Scotland) Order 2001 (S.S.I. 2001/54)
 Foot-and-Mouth Disease (Amendment) (No. 2) (Scotland) Order 2001 (S.S.I. 2001/55)
 Foot-and-Mouth Disease (Scotland) Declaratory Order 2001 (S.S.I. 2001/56)
 National Health Service (General Dental Services) (Scotland) Amendment Regulations 2001 (S.S.I. 2001/57)
 National Health Service (Primary Care) Act 1997 (Commencement No. 7) (Scotland) Order 2001 (S.S.I. 2001/58)
 Foot-and-Mouth Disease (Scotland) Declaratory (No. 2) Order 2001 (S.S.I. 2001/59)
 Foot-and-Mouth Disease Declaratory (Controlled Area) (Scotland) (No. 2) Order 2001 (S.S.I. 2001/60)
 Export Restrictions (Foot-and-Mouth Disease) Amendment (Scotland) Regulations 2001 (S.S.I. 2001/61)
 National Health Service (General Ophthalmic Services) (Scotland) Amendment Regulations 2001 (S.S.I. 2001/62)
 Foot-and-Mouth Disease (Scotland) Declaratory Amendment Order 2001 (S.S.I. 2001/63)
 Discontinuance of Legalised Police Cells (Portree) Rules 2001 (S.S.I. 2001/64)
 Foot-and-Mouth Disease (Scotland) Declaratory (Amendment No. 2) Order 2001 (S.S.I. 2001/65)
 Foot-and-Mouth Disease (Scotland) (Declaratory and Controlled Area) Amendment Order 2001 (S.S.I. 2001/66)
 National Health Service (Charges for Drugs and Appliances) (Scotland) Amendment Regulations 2001 (S.S.I. 2001/67)
 Budget (Scotland) Act 2000 (Amendment) (No. 2) Order 2001 (S.S.I. 2001/68)
 National Health Service (Dental Charges) (Scotland) Amendment Regulations 2001 (S.S.I. 2001/69)
 National Health Service (Pharmaceutical Services) (Scotland) Amendment Regulations 2001 (S.S.I. 2001/70)
 Non-Domestic Rates (Levying) (Scotland) Regulations 2001 (S.S.I. 2001/71)
 National Health Service (Personal Medical Services) (Scotland) Regulations 2001 (S.S.I. 2001/72)
 Restriction on Pithing (Scotland) Regulations 2001 (S.S.I. 2001/73)
 Police Grant (Scotland) Order 2001 (S.S.I. 2001/74)
 Adults with Incapacity (Public Guardian's Fees) (Scotland) Regulations 2001 (S.S.I. 2001/75)
 Adults with Incapacity (Certificates from Medical Practitioners) (Accounts and Funds) (Scotland) Regulations 2001 (S.S.I. 2001/76)
 Adults with Incapacity (Supervision of Welfare Attorneys by Local Authorities) (Scotland) Regulations 2001 (S.S.I. 2001/77)
 Adults with Incapacity (Countersignatories of Applications for Authority to Intromit) (Scotland) Regulations 2001 (S.S.I. 2001/78)
 Adults with Incapacity (Evidence in Relation to Dispensing with Intimation or Notification) (Scotland) Regulations 2001 (S.S.I. 2001/79)
 Adults with Incapacity (Certificates in Relation to Powers of Attorney) (Scotland) Regulations 2001 (S.S.I. 2001/80)
 Adults with Incapacity (Scotland) Act 2000 (Commencement No. 1) Order 2001 (S.S.I. 2001/81)
 Civil Legal Aid (Scotland) Amendment Regulations 2001 (S.S.I. 2001/82)
 Gaming Act (Variation of Fees) (Scotland) Order 2001 (S.S.I. 2001/83)
 Pesticides (Maximum Residue Levels in Crops, Food and Feeding Stuffs) (Scotland) Amendment Regulations 2001 (S.S.I. 2001/84)
 National Health Service (Choice of Medical Practitioner) (Scotland) Amendment Regulations 2001 (S.S.I. 2001/85)
 Specified Risk Material Amendment (No. 2) (Scotland) Regulations 2001 (S.S.I. 2001/86)
 Regulation of Investigatory Powers (Prescription of Offices, Ranks and Positions) (Scotland) Amendment Order 2001 (S.S.I. 2001/87)
 National Health Service (Optical Charges and Payments) (Scotland) Amendment Regulations 2001 (S.S.I. 2001/88)
 Meat (Hygiene and Inspection) (Charges) Amendment (Scotland) Regulations 2001 (S.S.I. 2001/89)
 Foot-and-Mouth Disease (Scotland) (Declaratory and Controlled Area) Amendment (No. 2) Order 2001 (S.S.I. 2001/90)
 Foot-and-Mouth Disease (Scotland) Declaratory (Amendment) (No. 3) Order 2001 (S.S.I. 2001/91)
 Act of Sederunt (Rules of the Court of Session Amendment No. 2) (Assistance In Investigations Undertaken by European Commission Into Certain Prohibited Practices and Abuses) 2001 (S.S.I. 2001/92)
 Act of Sederunt (Rules of the Court of Session Amendment No. 1) (Procedure for Offers to Make Amends) 2001 (S.S.I. 2001/93)
 Import and Export Restrictions (Foot-and-Mouth Disease) (Scotland) Regulations 2001 (S.S.I. 2001/95)
 Local Government Finance (Scotland) Order 2001 (S.S.I. 2001/96)
 A1 Trunk Road (Haddington West Interchange to Haddington East Interchange) (Temporary Prohibition of Traffic) (No. 2) Order 2001 (S.S.I. 2001/97)
 Defamation Act 1996 (Commencement No. 3 and Transitional Provision) (Scotland) Order 2001 (S.S.I. 2001/98)
 Environmental Protection Act 1990 (Amendment) (Scotland) Regulations 2001 (S.S.I. 2001/99)
 National Assistance (Sums for Personal Requirements) (Scotland) Regulations 2001 (S.S.I. 2001/100)

101-200

 Foot-and-Mouth Disease (Amendment) (No. 3) (Scotland) Order 2001 (S.S.I. 2001/101)
 Standards in Scotland's Schools etc. Act 2000 (Commencement No. 4) Order 2001 (S.S.I. 2001/102)
 Miscellaneous Food Additives (Amendment) (Scotland) Regulations 2001 (S.S.I. 2001/103)
 Feeding Stuffs (Sampling and Analysis) Amendment (Scotland) Regulations 2001 (S.S.I. 2001/104)
 National Assistance (Assessment of Resources) Amendment (No. 2) (Scotland) Regulations 2001 (S.S.I. 2001/105)
 A74(M) Motorway (Northbound and Southbound Off-Slip Roads at Junction 14 (Elvangort and Crauford) (Temporary Prohibition of Traffic) Order 2001 (S.S.I. 2001/106
A74(M) Motorway, (Northbound Off-Slip Road at Junction 15 (Beattock) and Southbound Off-Slip Road at Junction 16 (Johnstonbridge)) (Temporary Prohibition of Traffic) Order 2001 (S.S.I. 2001/107)
 A74(M)/M74 Motorway (Northbound and Southbound Off-Slip Roads at Junction 13 (Abington)) (Temporary Prohibition of Traffic) Order 2001 (S.S.I. 2001/108)
 Foot-and-Mouth Disease (Scotland) (Declaratory Orders) General Amendment Order 2001 (S.S.I. 2001/109)
 Foot-and-Mouth Disease (Scotland) Declaratory (Amendment) (No. 4) Order 2001 (S.S.I. 2001/110)
 Foot-and-Mouth Disease Declaratory (Controlled Area) (Scotland) (No. 3) Order 2001 (S.S.I. 2001/111)
 Import and Export Restrictions (Foot-and-Mouth Disease) (Scotland) Amendment Regulations 2001 (S.S.I. 2001/112)
 Ethical Standards in Public Life etc. (Scotland) Act 2000 (Commencement No. 1) Order 2001 (S.S.I. 2001/113)
 Domestic Water and Sewerage Charges (Reduction) (Scotland) Regulations 2001 (S.S.I. 2001/114)
 Valuation for Rating (Plant and Machinery) (Scotland) Amendment Regulations 2001 (S.S.I. 2001/115)
 Salmon Conservation (Scotland) Act 2001 (Commencement) Order 2001 (S.S.I. 2001/116)
 Sea Fishing (Enforcement of Community Quota and Third Country Fishing Measures) (Scotland) Order 2001 (S.S.I. 2001/117)
 National Health Service (General Medical Services) (Scotland) Amendment Regulations 2001 (S.S.I. 2001/119)
 Foot-and-Mouth Disease (Ascertainment of Value) (Scotland) Order 2001 (S.S.I. 2001/120)
 Foot-and-Mouth Disease (Ascertainment of Value) (Scotland) (No. 2) Order 2001 (S.S.I. 2001/121)
 Foot-and-Mouth Disease (Scotland) Declaratory (Amendment) (No. 5) Order 2001 (S.S.I. 2001/122)
 Civil Legal Aid (Financial Conditions) (Scotland) Regulations 2001 (S.S.I. 2001/123)
 Advice and Assistance (Financial Conditions) (Scotland) Regulations 2001 (S.S.I. 2001/124)
 Liquor Licensing (Fees) (Scotland) Order 2001 (S.S.I. 2001/125)
 Highlands and Islands Enterprise Area of Operation (Scotland) Order 2001 (S.S.I. 2001/126)
 Import and Export Restrictions (Foot-and-Mouth Disease) (Scotland) Amendment (No. 2) Regulations 2001 (S.S.I. 2001/127)
 Limited Liability Partnerships (Scotland) Regulations 2001 (S.S.I. 2001/128)
 Housing Support Grant (Scotland) Order 2001 (S.S.I. 2001/129)
 Foot-and-Mouth Disease (Ascertainment of Value) (Scotland) (No. 3) Order 2001 (S.S.I. 2001/130)
 Foot-and-Mouth Disease Declaratory (Controlled Area) (Scotland) (No. 3) Amendment Order 2001 (S.S.I. 2001/131)
 Transport (Scotland) Act 2001 (Commencement No. 1, Transitional Provisions and Savings) Order 2001 (S.S.I. 2001/132)
 A84 Trunk Road (Kilmahog) (40 mph Speed Limit) Order 2001 (S.S.I. 2001/ 133)
 Food Protection (Emergency Prohibitions) (Amnesic Shellfish Poisoning) (West Coast) (No. 2) (Scotland) Revocation Order 2001 (S.S.I. 2001/134)
 Act of Sederunt (Rules of the Court of Session Amendment No. 3 ) (Fees of Shorthand Writers) 2001 (S.S.I. 2001/135)
 Act of Sederunt (Fees of Shorthand Writers in the Sheriff Court) (Amendment) 2001 (S.S.I. 2001/136)
 NHS 24 (Scotland) Order 2001 (S.S.I. 2001/137)
 National Assistance (Assessment of Resources) Amendment (No. 3) (Scotland) Regulations 2001 (S.S.I. 2001/138)
 Civil Defence (Scotland) Regulations 2001 (S.S.I. 2001/139)
 Fisheries and Aquaculture Structures (Grants) (Scotland) Regulations 2001 (S.S.I. 2001/140)
 Import and Export Restrictions (Foot-and-Mouth Disease) (Scotland) Amendment (No. 3) Regulations 2001 (S.S.I. 2001/141)
 Act of Sederunt (Summary Applications, Statutory Applications and Appeals etc. Rules) Amendment (Adults with Incapacity) 2001 (S.S.I. 2001/142)
 Act of Sederunt (Child Support Rules) Amendment 2001 (S.S.I. 2001/143)
 Act of Sederunt (Ordinary Cause Rules) Amendment (European Matrimonial and Parental Responsibility Jurisdiction and Judgments) 2001 (S.S.I. 2001/144)
 Welfare of Animals (Slaughter or Killing) Amendment (Scotland) Regulations 2001 (S.S.I. 2001/145)
 Foot-and-Mouth Disease (Scotland) (Declaratory and Controlled Area) Amendment (No. 3) Order 2001 (S.S.I. 2001/146)
 A68 Trunk Road (Soutra Hill) (Side Roads) Order S.S.I. 2001/147)
 Foot-and-Mouth Disease (Scotland) Declaratory (Amendment) (No. 6) Order 2001 (S.S.I. 2001/148)
 Foot-and-Mouth Disease (Scotland) Declaratory (Amendment) (No. 7) Order 2001 (S.S.I. 2001/149)
 Foot-and-Mouth Disease Declaratory (Controlled Area) (Scotland) (No. 3) Amendment (No. 2) Order 2001 (S.S.I. 2001/150)
 Western Isles Salmon Fishery District Designation Order 2001 (S.S.I. 2001/151)
 Teachers' Superannuation (Pension Sharing on Divorce) (Scotland) Regulations 2001 152)
 Foot-and-Mouth Disease (Scotland) Declaratory (No. 3) Order 2001 (S.S.I. 2001/153)
 A95 Trunk Road (Kinveachy Junction Improvements) (Side Roads) Order S.S.I. 2001/154)
 A1 Edinburgh to Berwick Upon Tweed Trunk Road (Southbound On-Slip at the Bankton Interchange, Southbound Off-Slip at the B6363 Gladsmuir Interchange, Southbound On-Slip at the B6363 Gladsmuir Interchange) (Temporary Prohibition of Traffic) Order 2001 (S.S.I. 2001/155)
 A1 Edinburgh to Berwick Upon Tweed Trunk Road (Northbound Off-Slip at the A198 Bankton Interchange, Northbound On-Slip at the B6363 Gladsmuir Interchange, Northbound Off-Slip at the B6363 Gladsmuir Interchange) (Temporary Prohibition of Traffic) Order 2001 (S.S.I. 2001/156)
 Foot-and-Mouth Disease (Scotland) Declaratory (No. 4) Order 2001 (S.S.I. 2001/157)
 Import and Export Restrictions (Foot-and-Mouth Disease) (Scotland) Amendment (No. 4) Regulations 2001 (S.S.I. 2001/158)
 Foot-and-Mouth Disease (Scotland) (Declaratory and Controlled Area) Amendment (No. 4) Order 2001 (S.S.I. 2001/159)
 Foot-and-Mouth Disease (Marking of Meat and Meat Products) (Scotland) Regulations 2001 (S.S.I. 2001/160)
 Plant Protection Products Amendment (Scotland) Regulations 2001 (S.S.I. 2001/161)
 Milk and Milk Products (Pupils in Educational Establishments) (Scotland) Regulations 2001 (S.S.I. 2001/162)
 Fees in the Registers of Scotland Amendment Order 2001 (S.S.I. 2001/163)
 Town and Country Planning (Limit of Annual Value) (Scotland) Order 2001 (S.S.I. 2001/164)
 Foot-and-Mouth Disease (Scotland) Declaratory (No. 5) Order 2001 (S.S.I. 2001/165)
 Criminal Justice and Court Services Act 2000 (Commencement No. 5) (Scotland) Order 2001 (S.S.I. 2001/166)
 Transport (Scotland) Act 2001 (Commencement No. 2) Order 2001 (S.S.I. 2001/167)
 Foot-and-Mouth Disease (Scotland) Declaratory (No. 6) Order 2001 (S.S.I. 2001/168)
 Gelatine (Intra-Community Trade) (Scotland) Regulations 2001 (S.S.I. 2001/169)
 Foot-and-Mouth Disease Declaratory (Controlled Area) (Scotland) (No. 3) Amendment (No. 3) Order 2001 (S.S.I. 2001/170)
 Animal By-Products Amendment (Scotland) Order 2001 (S.S.I. 2001/171)
 European Communities (Service of Judicial and Extrajudicial Documents) (Scotland) Regulations 2001 (S.S.I. 2001/172)
 Sex Offenders (Notification Requirements) (Prescribed Police Stations) (Scotland) Regulations 2001 (S.S.I. 2001/173)
 Inshore Fishing (Prohibition of Fishing and Fishing Methods) (Scotland) Amendment Order 2001 (S.S.I. 2001/174)
 Water (Prevention of Pollution) (Code of Practice) (Scotland) Amendment Order 2001 (S.S.I. 2001/175)
 Trunk Roads (Restricted Roads) (Wigtownshire) (Variation) Order 2001 (S.S.I. 2001/176)
 A1 Edinburgh to Berwick Upon Tweed Trunk Road (Northbound On-Slip at the Oaktree Interchange, Northbound Off-Slip at the Oaktree Interchange) (Temporary Prohibition of Traffic) Order 2001 (S.S.I. 2001/177)
 Import and Export Restrictions (Foot-and-Mouth Disease) (Scotland) Amendment (No. 5) Regulations 2001 (S.S.I. 2001/178)
 Artificial Insemination of Cattle (Emergency Licences) (Scotland) Regulations 2001 (S.S.I. 2001/179)
 Foot-and-Mouth Disease (Scotland) Declaratory (No. 5) Amendment Order 2001 (S.S.I. 2001/180)
 Foot-and-Mouth Disease Declaratory (Controlled Area) (Scotland) (No. 3) Amendment (No. 4) Order 2001 (S.S.I. 2001/181)
 A1 Edinburgh to Berwick Upon Tweed Trunk Road (Southbound On-Slip at the Oaktree Interchange, Southbound Off-Slip at the Oaktree Interchange) (Temporary Prohibition of Traffic) Order 2001 (S.S.I. 2001/182)
 A1 Edinburgh to Berwick Upon Tweed Trunk Road (Haddington East Interchange to the Oaketree Interchange) (Temporary Prohibition of Traffic) Order 2001 (S.S.I. 2001/183)
 A90 (M90) Trunk Road (Glamis Junction) (Side Roads) Order S.S.I. 2001/184)
 Import and Export Restrictions (Foot-and-Mouth Disease) (Scotland) (No. 2) Regulations 2001 (S.S.I. 2001/186)
 Foot-and-Mouth Disease (Scotland) (Declaratory and Controlled Area) Amendment (No. 5) Order 2001 (S.S.I. 2001/187)
 Sex Offenders (Notice Requirements) (Foreign Travel) (Scotland) Regulations 2001 (S.S.I. 2001/188)
 Rendering (Fluid Treatment) (Scotland) Order 2001 (S.S.I. 2001/189)
 Sex Offenders (Notification Requirements) (Prescribed Police Stations) (Scotland) (No. 2) Regulations 2001 (S.S.I. 2001/190)
 Education (Graduate Endowment and Student Support) (Scotland) Act 2001 (Commencement) Order 2001 (S.S.I. 2001/191)
 Foot-and-Mouth Disease (Scotland) Declaratory (No.5) Amendment (No. 2) Order 2001 (S.S.I. 2001/192)
 Foot-and-Mouth Disease (Scotland) Declaratory (No. 7) Order 2001 (S.S.I. 2001/193)
 Foot-and-Mouth Disease (Scotland) Declaratory (No. 6) Amendment Order 2001 (S.S.I. 2001/194)
 Food Protection (Emergency Prohibitions) (Paralytic Shellfish Poisoning) (Orkney) (Scotland) Order 2001 (S.S.I. 2001/195)
 Foot-and-Mouth Disease (Scotland) Declaratory (No. 6) Amendment (No. 2) Order 2001 (S.S.I. 2001/196)
 A90 (M90) Trunk Road (Kirriemuir Junction) (Side Roads) Order S.S.I. 2001/197)
 Designation of Bell College of Technology (Scotland) Order 2001 (S.S.I. 2001/199)

201-300

 Plant Protection Products Amendment (No. 2) (Scotland) Regulations 2001 (S.S.I. 2001/202)
 Foot-and-Mouth Disease (Scotland) Declaratory (No. 5) Amendment (No. 3) Order 2001 (S.S.I. 2001/203)
 Foot-and-Mouth Disease (Scotland) (Declaratory and Controlled Area) Amendment (No. 6) Order 2001 (S.S.I. 2001/204)
 Part-Time Sheriffs (Removal Tribunal) Regulations 2001 (S.S.I. 2001/205)
 Control of Pollution (Silage, Slurry and Agricultural Fuel Oil) (Scotland) Regulations 2001 (S.S.I. 2001/206)
 Water Supply (Water Quality) (Scotland) Regulations 2001 (S.S.I. 2001/207)
 Crofting Community Development Scheme (Scotland) Regulations 2001 (S.S.I. 2001/208)
 Sports Grounds and Sporting Events (Designation) (Scotland) Amendment Order 2001 (S.S.I. 2001/209)
 Education (Student Loans) Amendment (Scotland) Regulations 2001 (S.S.I. 2001/210)
 Education (Student Loans) Amendment (Scotland) Regulations 2001 (S.S.I. 2001/211)
 Sweeteners in Food Amendment (Scotland) Regulations 2001 (S.S.I. 2001/212)
 A1 Trunk Road (Thistly Cross to West of Bowerhouse Junction Dualling) (Side Roads) Order S.S.I. 2001/213)
 Child Minding and Day Care (Registration and Inspection Fees) Amendment (Scotland) Regulations 2001 (S.S.I. 2001/214)
 Nursing Homes Registration (Scotland) Amendment Regulations 2001 (S.S.I. 2001/215)
 Nurses Agencies (Increase of Licence Fees) (Scotland) Regulations 2001 216)
 Justices of the Peace (Tribunal) (Scotland) Regulations 2001 (S.S.I. 2001/S.S.I. 2001/217)
 Existing Facilities in Quality Partnership Schemes (Scotland) Regulations 2001 (S.S.I. 2001/218)
 Public Service Vehicles (Registration of Local Services) (Scotland) Regulations 2001 (S.S.I. 2001/219)
 Agricultural Processing and Marketing Grants (Scotland) Regulations 2001 (S.S.I. 2001/220)
 Pesticides (Maximum Residue Levels in Crops, Food and Feeding Stuffs) (Scotland) Amendment (No. 2) Regulations 2001 (S.S.I. 2001/221)
 Education (Assisted Places) (Scotland) Regulations 2001 (S.S.I. 2001/222)
 St Mary's Music School (Aided Places) (Scotland) Regulations 2001 (S.S.I. 2001/223)
 Air Quality Limit Values (Scotland) Regulations 2001 (S.S.I. 2001/224)
 Suckler Cow Premium (Scotland) Regulations 2001 (S.S.I. 2001/225)
 Agricultural Subsidies (Appeals) (Scotland) Amendment Regulations 2001 (S.S.I. 2001/226)
 Repayment of Student Loans (Scotland) Amendment Regulations 2001 (S.S.I. 2001/227)
 Education (Student Loans) (Scotland) Regulations 2000 Amendment Regulations 2001 (S.S.I. 2001/228)
 Students' Allowances (Scotland) Amendment Regulations 2001 (S.S.I. 2001/229)
 Gaming Act (Variation of Fees) (No.2) (Scotland) Order 2001 (S.S.I. 2001/230)
 BSE Monitoring (Scotland) Regulations 2001 (S.S.I. 2001/231)
 Lerwick Harbour Revision Order 2001 (S.S.I. 2001/232)
 A76 Trunk Road (Crossroads Junction Improvement) (Side Roads) Order S.S.I. 2001/233)
 Bell College of Technology (Scotland) Order of Council 2001 (S.S.I. 2001/234)
 Adoption (Intercountry Aspects) Act 1999 (Commencement No. 6) Order 2001 (S.S.I. 2001/235)
 Adoption of Children from Overseas (Scotland) Regulations 2001 (S.S.I. 2001/236)
 Food Protection (Emergency Prohibitions) (Paralytic Shellfish Poisoning) (West Coast) (Scotland) Order 2001 (S.S.I. 2001/237)
 Water Supply (Water Quality) (Scotland) Amendment Regulations 2001 (S.S.I. 2001/238)
 A85 Trunk Road (St Fillans) (30 mph Speed Limit) Order 2001 (S.S.I. 2001/240)
 Food Protection (Emergency Prohibitions) (Paralytic Shellfish Poisoning) (Orkney) (No. 2) (Scotland) Order 2001 (S.S.I. 2001/241)
 Protection of Wrecks (Designation) (Scotland) Order 2001 (S.S.I. 2001/242)
 Import and Export Restrictions (Foot-and-Mouth Disease) (Scotland) (No. 2) Amendment Regulations 2001 (S.S.I. 2001/243)
 Town and Country Planning (General Permitted Development) (Scotland) Amendment Order 2001 (S.S.I. 2001/244)
 Town and Country Planning (General Permitted Development) (Scotland) Amendment Order 2001 (S.S.I. 2001/245)
 Foot-and-Mouth Disease (Scotland) (Declaratory and Controlled Area) Amendment (No. 7) Order 2001 (S.S.I. 2001/246)
 Foot-and-Mouth Disease (Scotland) Declaratory (No. 5) Amendment (No. 4) Order 2001 (S.S.I. 2001/247)
 Control of Pollution (Silage, Slurry and Agricultural Fuel Oil) (Scotland) Amendment Regulations 2001 (S.S.I. 2001/248)
 Plant Health (Great Britain) Amendment (Scotland) Order 2001 (S.S.I. 2001/249)
 Sea Fish (Specified Sea Areas) (Regulation of Nets and Other Fishing Gear) (Scotland) Amendment Order 2001 (S.S.I. 2001/250)
 Public Service Vehicles (Registration of Local Services) (Scotland) Amendment Regulations 2001 (S.S.I. 2001/251)
 Beef Labelling (Enforcement) (Scotland) Regulations 2001 (S.S.I. 2001/252)
 Registered Establishments (Fees) (Scotland) Order 2001 (S.S.I. 2001/253)
 A82 Trunk Road (Invermoriston) (40 mph Speed Limit) Order 2001 (S.S.I. 2001/254)
 Food Protection (Emergency Prohibitions) (Paralytic Shellfish Poisoning) (Orkney) (No. 3) (Scotland) Order 2001 (S.S.I. 2001/255)
 Food Protection (Emergency Prohibitions) (Paralytic Shellfish Poisoning) (East Coast) (Scotland) Order 2001 (S.S.I. 2001/256)
 Products of Animal Origin (Import and Export) Amendment (Scotland) Regulations 2001 (S.S.I. 2001/257)
 Foot-and-Mouth Disease (Scotland) (Declaratory Orders) General Amendment (No. 2) Order 2001 (S.S.I. 2001/258)
 Farm Business Development (Scotland) Scheme 2001 (S.S.I. 2001/259)
 Local Government Finance (Scotland) (No. 2) Order 2001 (S.S.I. 2001/260)
 Foot-and-Mouth Disease (Control of Vaccination) (Scotland) Regulations 2001 (S.S.I. 2001/261)
 Comhairle nan Eilean Siar (Aird Mhor, Barra) Harbour Empowerment Order 2001 (S.S.I. 2001/262)
 Foot-and-Mouth Disease (Scotland) (Declaratory Orders) General Revocation Order 2001 (S.S.I. 2001/264)
 Consumer Protection Act 1987 (Product Liability) (Modification) (Scotland) Order 2001 (S.S.I. 2001/265)
 Town and Country Planning (General Permitted Development) (Scotland) Amendment (No. 2) Order 2001 (S.S.I. 2001/266)
 Home Energy Efficiency Scheme Amendment (Scotland) Regulations 2001 (S.S.I. 2001/267)
 A85 Trunk Road (West Hintingtower/Lochty) (40 mph Speed Limit) Order 2001 (S.S.I. 2001/268)
 A84/A85 Trunk Road (Callander) (30 mph Speed Limit) Order 2001 (S.S.I. 2001/269)
 A9 Trunk Road (Stafford Street, Helmsdale) (Temporary Prohibition of Traffic) Order 2001 (S.S.I. 2001/270)
 Import and Export Restrictions (Foot-and-Mouth Disease) (Scotland) (No. 2) Amendment (No. 2) Regulations 2001 (S.S.I. 2001/271)
 Foot-and-Mouth Disease (Scotland) Declaratory (No. 5) Amendment (No. 5) Order 2001 (S.S.I. 2001/272)
 Food Protection (Emergency Prohibitions) (Amnesic Shellfish Poisoning) (West Coast) (Scotland) Order 2001 (S.S.I. 2001/273)
 Convention Rights (Compliance) (Scotland) Act 2001 (Commencement) Order 2001 (S.S.I. 2001/274)
 Foot-and-Mouth Disease (Scotland) Declaratory (No. 5) Amendment (No. 6) Order 2001 (S.S.I. 2001/275)
 Processed Animal Protein (Scotland) Regulations 2001 (S.S.I. 2001/276)
 A90 Trunk Road (Aberdeen to Dyce Millennium Cycle Route) (Redetermination of Means of Exercise of Public Right of Passage) Order S.S.I. 2001/277)
 Graduate Endowment (Scotland) Regulations 2001 (S.S.I. 2001/280)
 Food Protection (Emergency Prohibitions) (Amnesic Shellfish Poisoning) (West Coast) (No. 2) (Scotland) Order 2001 (S.S.I. 2001/281)
 Food Protection (Emergency Prohibitions) (Amnesic, Paralytic and Diarrhetic Shellfish Poisoning) (Orkney) (Scotland) Order 2001 (S.S.I. 2001/282)
 Food Protection (Emergency Prohibitions) (Amnesic Shellfish Poisoning) (West Coast) (No. 3) (Scotland) Order 2001 (S.S.I. 2001/284)
 A1 Trunk Road (East of Haddington to Dunbar) Special Road (Variation) Scheme S.S.I. 2001/285)
 A1 Trunk Road (East of Haddington to Dunbar) Special Road (Side Roads) (Variation) Order S.S.I. 2001/286)
 Specified Risk Material Amendment (Scotland) Order 2001 (S.S.I. 2001/287)
 Specified Risk Material Amendment (No. 3) (Scotland) Regulations 2001 (S.S.I. 2001/288)
 Food Protection (Emergency Prohibitions) (Amnesic Shellfish Poisoning) (West Coast) (No. 4) (Scotland) Order 2001 (S.S.I. 2001/289)
 Foot-and-Mouth Disease Declaratory (Controlled Area) (Scotland) (No. 3) Amendment (No. 5) Order 2001 (S.S.I. 2001/290)
 Teachers' Superannuation (Scotland) Amendment Regulations 2001 (S.S.I. 2001/291)
 Teachers' Superannuation (Additional Voluntary Contributions) (Scotland) Amendment Regulations 2001 (S.S.I. 2001/292)
 Food Protection (Emergency Prohibitions) (Paralytic Shellfish Poisoning) (Orkney) (Scotland) Revocation Order 2001 (S.S.I. 2001/294)
 Food Protection (Emergency Prohibitions) (Amnesic Shellfish Poisoning) (West Coast) (No. 5) (Scotland) Order 2001 (S.S.I. 2001/295)
 A9 Trunk Road (Ballinling) (Temporary 50 mph Speed Limit) Order 2001 (S.S.I. 2001/296)
 Foot-and-Mouth Disease (Ascertainment of Value) (Scotland) (No. 4) Order 2001 (S.S.I. 2001/297)
 Right to Time Off for Study or Training (Scotland) Amendment (No. 2) Regulations 2001 (S.S.I. 2001/298)
 Rural Stewardship Scheme (Scotland) Regulations 2001 (S.S.I. 2001/300)

301-400

 National Health Service Trusts (Membership and Procedure) (Scotland) Regulations 2001 (S.S.I. 2001/301)
 Health Boards (Membership and Procedure) (Scotland) Regulations 2001 (S.S.I. 2001/302)
 Scottish Social Services Council (Appointments, Procedure and Access to the Register) Regulations 2001 (S.S.I. 2001/303)
 Regulation of Care (Scotland) Act 2001 (Commencement No. 1) Order 2001 (S.S.I. 2001/304)
 Act of Sederunt (Rules of the Court of Session Amendment No.4) (Miscellaneous) 2001 (S.S.I. 2001/305)
 Criminal Legal Aid (Scotland) Amendment Regulations 2001 (S.S.I. 2001/306)
 Criminal Legal Aid (Fixed Payments) (Scotland) Amendment Regulations 2001 (S.S.I. 2001/307)
 Land Registration (Scotland) Act 1979 (Commencement No. 15) Order 2001 (S.S.I. 2001/309)
 Firemen's Pension Scheme (Pension Sharing on Divorce) (Scotland) Order 2001 (S.S.I. 2001/310)
 Education (Student Loans) (Scotland) Regulations 2000 Amendment (No. 2) Regulations 2001 (S.S.I. 2001/311)
 Foot-and-Mouth Disease (Scotland) Declaratory (No. 5) Revocation Order 2001 (S.S.I. 2001/312)
 Food Protection (Emergency Prohibitions) (Radioactivity in Sheep) Partial Revocation (Scotland) Order 2001 (S.S.I. 2001/313)
 Food Protection (Emergency Prohibitions) (Paralytic Shellfish Poisoning) (West Coast) (Scotland) Revocation Order 2001 (S.S.I. 2001/314)
 Parole Board (Scotland) Rules 2001 (S.S.I. 2001/315)
 Food Protection (Emergency Prohibitions) (Amnesic Shellfish Poisoning) (West Coast) (No. 6) (Scotland) Order 2001 (S.S.I. 2001/316)
 Food Protection (Emergency Prohibitions) (Amnesic Shellfish Poisoning) (East Coast) (Scotland) Order 2001 (S.S.I. 2001/317)
 Highlands and Islands Agricultural Programme and Rural Diversification Programme (Scotland) Amendment Regulations 2001 (S.S.I. 2001/319)
 Building Standards (Scotland) Amendment Regulations 2001 (S.S.I. 2001/320)
 Farm and Conservation Grant Amendment (Scotland) Regulations 2001 (S.S.I. 2001/321)
 Food Protection (Emergency Prohibitions) (Amnesic Shellfish Poisoning) (West Coast) (No. 7) (Scotland) Order 2001 (S.S.I. 2001/322)
 Housing (Scotland) Act 2001 (Registered Social Landlords) Order 2001 (S.S.I. 2001/326)
 Education and Training (Scotland) Amendment Regulations 2001 (S.S.I. 2001/329)
 Fishing Vessels (Decommissioning) (Scotland) Scheme 2001 (S.S.I. 2001/332)
 Potatoes Originating in Germany (Notification) (Scotland) Order 2001 (S.S.I. 2001/333)
 Feeding Stuffs and the Feeding Stuffs (Enforcement) Amendment (Scotland) Regulations 2001 (S.S.I. 2001/334)
 Fossil Fuel Levy (Scotland) Amendment Regulations 2001 (S.S.I. 2001/335)
 Housing (Scotland) Act 2001 (Commencement No. 1, Transitional Provisions and Savings) Order 2001 (S.S.I. 2001/336)
 Wildlife and Countryside Act 1981 (Amendment) (Scotland) Regulations 2001 (S.S.I. 2001/337)
 Argyll and Clyde Acute Hospitals National Health Service Trust (Establishment) Amendment Order 2001 (S.S.I. 2001/338)
 Ayrshire and Arran Primary Care National Health Service Trust (Establishment) Amendment Order 2001 (S.S.I. 2001/339)
 Ayrshire and Arran Acute Hospitals National Health Service Trust (Establishment) Amendment Order 2001 (S.S.I. 2001/340)
 Borders General Hospital National Health Service Trust (Establishment) Amendment Order 2001 (S.S.I. 2001/341)
 Fife Acute Hospitals National Health Service Trust (Establishment) Amendment Order 2001 (S.S.I. 2001/342)
 Dumfries and Galloway Primary Care National Health Service Trust (Establishment) Amendment Order 2001 (S.S.I. 2001/343)
 Borders Primary Care National Health Service Trust (Establishment) Amendment Order 2001 (S.S.I. 2001/344)
 Dumfries and Galloway Acute and Maternity Hospitals National Health Service Trust (Establishment) Amendment Order 2001 (S.S.I. 2001/345)
 Grampian Primary Care National Health Service Trust (Establishment) Amendment Order 2001 (S.S.I. 2001/346)
 Forth Valley Primary Care National Health Service Trust (Establishment) Amendment Order 2001 (S.S.I. 2001/347)
 Forth Valley Acute Hospitals National Health Service Trust (Establishment) Amendment Order 2001 (S.S.I. 2001/348)
 Fife Primary Care National Health Service Trust (Establishment) Amendment Order 2001 (S.S.I. 2001/349)
 Grampian University Hospitals National Health Service Trust (Establishment) Amendment Order 2001 (S.S.I. 2001/350)
 Greater Glasgow Primary Care National Health Service Trust (Establishment) Amendment Order 2001 (S.S.I. 2001/351)
 Highland Acute Hospitals National Health Service Trust (Establishment) Amendment Order 2001 (S.S.I. 2001/352)
 Highland Primary Care National Health Service Trust (Establishment) Amendment Order 2001 (S.S.I. 2001/353)
 Lomond and Argyll Primary Care National Health Service Trust (Establishment) Amendment Order 2001 (S.S.I. 2001/354)
 Lothian Primary Care National Health Service Trust (Establishment) Amendment Order 2001 (S.S.I. 2001/355)
 Lanarkshire Primary Care National Health Service Trust (Establishment) Amendment Order 2001 (S.S.I. 2001/356)
 Lanarkshire Acute Hospitals National Health Service Trust (Establishment) Amendment Order 2001 (S.S.I. 2001/357)
 Foot-and-Mouth Disease (Marking of Meat, Meat Products, Minced Meat and Meat Preparations) (Scotland) Regulations 2001 (S.S.I. 2001/358)
 Lothian University Hospitals National Health Service Trust (Establishment) Amendment Order 2001 (S.S.I. 2001/359)
 North Glasgow University Hospitals National Health Service Trust (Establishment) Amendment Order 2001 (S.S.I. 2001/360)
 Renfrewshire and Inverclyde Primary Care National Health Service Trust (Establishment) Amendment Order 2001 (S.S.I. 2001/361)
 South Glasgow University Hospitals National Health Service Trust (Establishment) Amendment Order 2001 (S.S.I. 2001/362)
 Tayside Primary Care National Health Service Trust (Establishment) Amendment Order 2001 (S.S.I. 2001/363)
 Tayside University Hospitals National Health Service Trust (Establishment) Amendment Order 2001 (S.S.I. 2001/364)
 West Lothian Healthcare National Health Service Trust (Establishment) Amendment Order 2001 (S.S.I. 2001/365)
 Yorkhill National Health Service Trust (Establishment) Amendment Order 2001 (S.S.I. 2001/366)
 Import and Export Restrictions (Foot-and-Mouth Disease) (Scotland) (No. 2) Amendment (No. 3) Regulations 2001 (S.S.I. 2001/367)
 National Health Service (General Dental Services) (Scotland) Amendment (No. 2) Regulations 2001 (S.S.I. 2001/368)
 North of Scotland Water Authority (River Lochy Abstraction Scheme) Water Order 2001 (S.S.I. 2001/369)
 A7 Trunk Road (Sandbed and Albert Bridge, Hawick) (Temporary One Way Traffic) Order 2001 (S.S.I. 2001/371)
 Food Protection (Emergency Prohibitions) (Amnesic Shellfish Poisoning) (West Coast) (No. 8) (Scotland) Order 2001 (S.S.I. 2001/374)
 A828 Trunk Road (Appin/Tynnbbie) (40 mph Speed Limit) Order 2001 (S.S.I. 2001/379)
 A828 (Portnaroish) (40 mph Speed Limit) Order 2001 (S.S.I. 2001/380)
 Criminal Legal Aid (Scotland) (Prescribed Proceedings) Amendment Regulations 2001 (S.S.I. 2001/381)
 Advice and Assistance (Assistance by Way of Representation) (Scotland) Amendment (No. 3) Regulations 2001 (S.S.I. 2001/382)
 Processed Animal Protein (Scotland) Amendment Regulations 2001 (S.S.I. 2001/383)
 Protection of Wrecks (Designation) (No. 2) (Scotland) Order 2001 (S.S.I. 2001/384)
 Food Protection (Emergency Prohibitions) (Paralytic Shellfish Poisoning) (East Coast) (No. 2) (Scotland) Order 2001 (S.S.I. 2001/387)
 Food Protection (Emergency Prohibitions) (Amnesic Shellfish Poisoning) (West Coast) (No. 9) (Scotland) Order 2001 (S.S.I. 2001/388)
 Glasgow Science Centre Pedestrian Bridge Scheme 2001 Confirmation Instrument S.S.I. 2001/389)
 Abolition of the Intervention Board for Agricultural Produce (Consequential Provisions) (Scotland) Regulations 2001 (S.S.I. 2001/390)
 Food Protection (Emergency Prohibitions) (Diarrhetic Shellfish Poisoning) (Orkney) (Scotland) Order 2001 (S.S.I. 2001/391)
 Legal Aid (Employment of Solicitors) (Scotland) Regulations 2001 (S.S.I. 2001/392)
 Legal Aid (Scotland) Act 1986 (Commencement No. 4) Order 2001 (S.S.I. 2001/393)
 Import and Export Restrictions (Foot-and-Mouth Disease) (Scotland) (No. 2) Amendment (No. 4) Regulations 2001 (S.S.I. 2001/394)
 Food Protection (Emergency Prohibitions) (Amnesic Shellfish Poisoning) (West Coast) (Scotland) Partial Revocation Order 2001 (S.S.I. 2001/395)
 Housing (Scotland) Act 2001 (Transfer of Scottish Homes Property etc.) Order 2001 (S.S.I. 2001/396)
 Housing (Scotland) Act 2001 (Commencement No. 2, Transitional Provisions, Savings and Variation) Order 2001 (S.S.I. 2001/397)
 A82 Trunk Road (Invermoriston) (40 mph Speed Limit) Order 2001 (S.S.I. 2001/398)
 Standards in Scotland's Schools etc. Act 2000 (Commencement No. 3 and Transitional Provisions) Amendment Order 2001 (S.S.I. 2001/400)

401-494

  The Import and Export Restrictions (Foot-and-Mouth Disease) (Scotland) (Recovery of Costs) Regulations 2001 (S.S.I. 2001/401)
  The Holyrood Park Amendment Regulations 2001 (S.S.I. 2001/405)
  The Food Protection (Emergency Prohibitions) (Amnesic Shellfish Poisoning) (West Coast) (No. 10) (Scotland) Order 2001 (S.S.I. 2001/406)
  The Northern College of Education (Closure) (Scotland) Order 2001 (S.S.I. 2001/407)
  The Diligence against Earnings (Variation) (Scotland) Regulations 2001 (S.S.I. 2001/408)
  The Fish Health Amendment (Scotland) Regulations 2001 (S.S.I. 2001/409)
  The Pensions Appeal Tribunals (Scotland) (Amendment) Rules 2001 (S.S.I. 2001/410)
  The Food Protection (Emergency Prohibitions) (Paralytic Shellfish Poisoning) (Orkney) (No. 2) (Scotland) Revocation Order 2001 (S.S.I. 2001/411)
  The Food Protection (Emergency Prohibitions) (Amnesic Shellfish Poisoning) (East Coast) (Scotland) Revocation Order 2001 (S.S.I. 2001/412)
  The Food Protection (Emergency Prohibitions) (Amnesic Shellfish Poisoning) (West Coast) (Scotland) Partial Revocation (No. 2) Order 2001 (S.S.I. 2001/413)
  The Food Protection (Emergency Prohibitions) (Amnesic Shellfish Poisoning) (West Coast) (No. 3) (Scotland) Partial Revocation Order 2001 (S.S.I. 2001/414)
  The Import and Export Restrictions (Foot-and-Mouth Disease) (Scotland) (No. 2) Amendment (No. 5) Regulations 2001 (S.S.I. 2001/415)
  The Mortgage Rights (Scotland) Act 2001 (Commencement and Transitional Provision) Order 2001 (S.S.I. 2001/418 (C. 18))
  The Mortgage Rights (Scotland) Act 2001 (Prescribed Notice) Order 2001 (S.S.I. 2001/419)
  The Food Protection (Emergency Prohibitions) (Amnesic Shellfish Poisoning) (West Coast) (No. 11) (Scotland) Order 2001 (S.S.I. 2001/420)
  The Potatoes Originating in Egypt (Scotland) Regulations 2001 (S.S.I. 2001/421)
  The Colours in Food Amendment (Scotland) Regulations 2001 (S.S.I. 2001/422)
  The Food Protection (Emergency Prohibitions) (Amnesic Shellfish Poisoning) (West Coast) (No. 12) (Scotland) Order 2001 (S.S.I. 2001/423)
  The Scottish Social Services Council (Consultation on Codes of Practice) Order 2001 (S.S.I. 2001/424)
  The Food Protection (Emergency Prohibitions) (Amnesic Shellfish Poisoning) (West Coast) (No. 13) (Scotland) Order 2001 (S.S.I. 2001/425)
  The Import and Export Restrictions (Foot-and-Mouth Disease) (Scotland) (No. 3) Regulations 2001 (S.S.I. 2001/429)
  The National Health Service (Charges for Drugs and Appliances) (Scotland) Regulations 2001 (S.S.I. 2001/430)
  The Local Government (Exemption from Competition) (Scotland) Amendment Order 2001 (S.S.I. 2001/431)
  The Local Government Act 1988 (Competition) (Scotland) Amendment Regulations 2001 (S.S.I. 2001/432)
  The Smoke Control Areas (Authorised Fuels) (Scotland) Regulations 2001 (S.S.I. 2001/433)
  The Food Protection (Emergency Prohibitions) (Amnesic Shellfish Poisoning) (West Coast) (No. 2) (Scotland) Partial Revocation Order 2001 (S.S.I. 2001/434)
  The Pesticides (Maximum Residue Levels in Crops, Food and Feeding Stuffs) (Scotland) Amendment (No. 3) Regulations 2001 (S.S.I. 2001/435)
  The National Health Service (Superannuation Scheme, Injury Benefits and Compensation for Premature Retirement) (Scotland) Amendment Regulations 2001 (S.S.I. 2001/437)
  Act of Sederunt (Fees of Solicitors in the Sheriff Court) (Amendment) 2001 (S.S.I. 2001/438)
  Act of Sederunt (Fees of Sheriff Officers) 2001 (S.S.I. 2001/439)
  Act of Sederunt (Fees of Messengers-At-Arms) 2001 (S.S.I. 2001/440)
  Act of Sederunt (Rules of the Court of Session Amendment No. 5) (Fees of Solicitors) 2001 (S.S.I. 2001/441)
  The Food Protection (Emergency Prohibitions) (Amnesic Shellfish Poisoning) (West Coast) (Scotland) Order 2001 Revocation Order 2001 (S.S.I. 2001/442)
  The Food Protection (Emergency Prohibitions) (Paralytic Shellfish Poisoning) (East Coast) (No. 2) (Scotland) Revocation Order 2001 (S.S.I. 2001/443)
  The Food Protection (Emergency Prohibitions) (Amnesic Shellfish Poisoning) (West Coast) (No. 3) (Scotland) Revocation Order 2001 (S.S.I. 2001/444)
  The Beef Special Premium (Scotland) Regulations 2001 (S.S.I. 2001/445)
  The Local Government Act 1988 (Competition) (Scotland) Amendment (No. 2) Regulations 2001 (S.S.I. 2001/446)
  The Community Care (Direct Payments) (Scotland) Amendment Regulations 2001 (S.S.I. 2001/447)
  The Sea Fishing (Enforcement of Community Satellite Monitoring Measures) (Scotland) Order 2000 Amendment Regulations 2001 (S.S.I. 2001/448)
  The Inshore Fishing (Prohibition of Fishing for Cockles) (Scotland) Amendment Order 2001 (S.S.I. 2001/449)
  The Miscellaneous Food Additives (Amendment) (No. 2) (Scotland) Regulations 2001 (S.S.I. 2001/450)
  The Food Protection (Emergency Prohibitions) (Amnesic Shellfish Poisoning) (West Coast) (No. 14) (Scotland) Order 2001 (S.S.I. 2001/451)
  The Plant Protection Products Amendment (No. 3) (Scotland) Regulations 2001 (S.S.I. 2001/454)
  The Import and Export Restrictions (Foot-and-Mouth Disease) (Scotland) (No. 3) Amendment Regulations 2001 (S.S.I. 2001/455)
  The International Criminal Court (Scotland) Act 2001 (Commencement) Order 2001 (S.S.I. 2001/456 (C. 20))
  The Fraserburgh Harbour Revision (Constitution) Order 2001 (S.S.I. 2001/457)
  The Sheep and Goats Spongiform Encephalopathy (Compensation) Amendment (Scotland) Order 2001 (S.S.I. 2001/458)
  The Police Pensions (Pension Sharing on Divorce) (Scotland) Amendment Regulations 2001 (S.S.I. 2001/459)
  The Local Government Pension Scheme (Scotland) Amendment Regulations 2001 (S.S.I. 2001/460)
  The Police Pensions (Additional Voluntary Contributions and Increased Benefits) (Pension Sharing) (Scotland) Amendment Regulations 2001 (S.S.I. 2001/461)
  The Food Protection (Emergency Prohibitions) (Paralytic Shellfish Poisoning) (East Coast) (Scotland) Revocation Order 2001 (S.S.I. 2001/462)
  The Food Protection (Emergency Prohibitions) (Amnesic, Paralytic and Diarrhetic Shellfish Poisoning) (Orkney) (Scotland) Partial Revocation Order 2001 (S.S.I. 2001/463)
  The Legal Aid (Scotland) Act 1986 (Availability of Solicitors) Regulations 2001 (S.S.I. 2001/464)
  The National Health Service (Scotland) (Superannuation Scheme and Additional Voluntary Contributions) (Pension Sharing on Divorce) Amendment Regulations 2001 (S.S.I. 2001/465)
  The Road Traffic (NHS Charges) Amendment (Scotland) Regulations 2001 (S.S.I. 2001/466)
  The Housing (Scotland) Act 2001 (Commencement No. 3, Transitional Provisions and Savings) Order 2001 (S.S.I. 2001/467 (C. 21))
  The Food Protection (Emergency Prohibitions) (Amnesic Shellfish Poisoning) (West Coast) (No. 13) (Scotland) Revocation Order 2001 (S.S.I. 2001/468)
  The Food Protection (Emergency Prohibitions) (Amnesic Shellfish Poisoning) (West Coast) (No. 9) (Scotland) Partial Revocation Order 2001 (S.S.I. 2001/469)
  The Food Protection (Emergency Prohibitions) (Amnesic Shellfish Poisoning) (West Coast) (No. 11) (Scotland) Revocation Order 2001 (S.S.I. 2001/470)
  The Food Protection (Emergency Prohibitions) (Amnesic Shellfish Poisoning) (West Coast) (No. 10) (Scotland) Revocation Order 2001 (S.S.I. 2001/471)
  The Food Protection (Emergency Prohibitions) (Amnesic Shellfish Poisoning) (West Coast) (No. 6) (Scotland) Order 2001 Revocation Order 2001 (S.S.I. 2001/472)
  The Food Protection (Emergency Prohibitions) (Amnesic Shellfish Poisoning) (West Coast) (No. 4) (Scotland) Partial Revocation Order 2001 (S.S.I. 2001/473)
  The Ethical Standards in Public Life etc. (Scotland) Act 2000 (Commencement No. 2 and Transitional Provisions) Order 2001 (S.S.I. 2001/474 (C. 22))
  The Children (Scotland) Act 1995 (Commencement No.4) Order 2001 (S.S.I. 2001/475 (C. 23))
  The Panels of Persons to Safeguard the Interests of Children (Scotland) Regulations 2001 (S.S.I. 2001/476)
  The Curators ad Litem and Reporting Officers (Panels) (Scotland) Regulations 2001 (S.S.I. 2001/477)
  The Children’s Hearings (Legal Representation) (Scotland) Rules 2001 (S.S.I. 2001/478)
  Act of Adjournal (Criminal Procedural Rules Amendment) (Convention Rights (Compliance) (Scotland) Act 2001) 2001 (S.S.I. 2001/479)
  The Budget (Scotland) Act 2001 (Amendment) Order 2001 (S.S.I. 2001/480)
  The Foot-and-Mouth Disease Declaratory (Controlled Area) (Scotland) (No. 3) Amendment (No. 6) Order 2001 (S.S.I. 2001/481)
  The Police Act 1997 (Commencement No. 8) (Scotland) Order 2001 (S.S.I. 2001/482 (C. 24))
  The Import and Export Restrictions (Foot-and-Mouth Disease) (Scotland) (No. 3) Amendment (No. 2) Regulations 2001 (S.S.I. 2001/483)
  The Rural Diversification Programme (Scotland) Amendment Regulations 2001 (S.S.I. 2001/484)
  Act of Adjournal (Criminal Procedural Rules Amendment No.2) (Terrorism Act 2000 and Anti-Terrorism, Crime and Security Act 2001) 2001 (S.S.I. 2001/486)
  Act of Sederunt (Rules of the Court of Session Amendment No. 6) (Terrorism Act 2000) 2001 (S.S.I. 2001/494)

External links
 Scottish Statutory Instrument List
 Scottish  Draft Statutory Instrument List

2001
Statutory Instruments
Scotland Statutory Instruments